Harish Nagpal (born 3 August 1964) is an Indian politician for the Amroha (Lok Sabha Constituency) in Uttar Pradesh.

External links
 Official biographical sketch in Parliament of India website

1964 births
Living people
India MPs 2004–2009
People from Amroha
Lok Sabha members from Uttar Pradesh
Independent politicians in India